The 2005 NHL Entry Draft was the 43rd NHL Entry Draft. Originally scheduled to be held on June 25, the 2004–05 NHL lockout led to the draft being postponed to July 30.

Special procedures were required to determine the order of picks, because the previous season had been cancelled due to the lockout. The first overall pick was won in a lottery by the Pittsburgh Penguins, who selected Sidney Crosby.

Venue 

The draft was originally scheduled to be held on June 25, hosted by the Ottawa Senators at the Corel Centre (their home rink). However, the 2004–05 NHL lockout was still ongoing, causing the draft to be postponed. The lockout ended on 22 July with the approval of a new NHL collective bargaining agreement (CBA). The CBA set the new date of the draft as 30 July. The Corel Centre was still available but cannot be used on such short notice. The draft was instead held at the Westin Hotel in Ottawa, Ontario. The Senators were compensated by hosting the 2008 draft instead.

As a result of the rearrangement, the draft was not open to the public, for the first time since 1980. Nor was it possible for large numbers of drafted players to attend: only the twenty highest prospects on the NHL Central Scouting rankings were present.

Procedures 
The order of draft picks was usually determined by team performance in the previous season, with teams picking in the same order in each round (modified by any trading of draft picks). However, the lockout had led to the complete cancellation of the 2004–05 NHL season, so there were no final positions to base the draft order on. The new CBA modified the draft procedures accordingly.

The order of picks in the first round was determined by a weighted lottery. In the second round this order was reversed, so the team with the 30th pick would also receive the 31st pick, whilst the team with first overall pick would not pick again until the 60th pick (last pick in the second round). The order would continue alternating in each subsequent round, producing a 'snaking' order. Teams were permitted to trade their draft picks as usual, which led to some modifications to the order.

The new CBA reduced the draft length to seven rounds, compared to the nine rounds used previously. As a result, 230 players were selected.

Lottery 
The lottery was held on July 22, the same day that the new CBA was approved. The top-rated prospect in this draft was Sidney Crosby, and it was widely assumed that he would be the first overall pick by whichever team won the lottery, so it became known colloquially as the 'Sidney Crosby Sweepstakes'.

Teams were weighted based on playoff appearances in the last three completed seasons (2001-02, 02-03 and 03-04), and first overall picks in the last four drafts (2001, 2002, 2003 and 2004). Three lottery balls each were assigned to teams which had not qualified for any of those playoffs and received no first overall picks in that period. Teams which had one playoff appearance or first overall pick in those years were given two lottery balls. All other teams received one lottery ball.

Three balls
Buffalo Sabres, Columbus Blue Jackets, New York Rangers, Pittsburgh Penguins

Two balls
Mighty Ducks of Anaheim, Atlanta Thrashers, Calgary Flames, Carolina Hurricanes, Chicago Blackhawks, Edmonton Oilers, Los Angeles Kings, Minnesota Wild, Nashville Predators, Phoenix Coyotes

One ball
Boston Bruins, Colorado Avalanche, Dallas Stars, Detroit Red Wings, Florida Panthers, Montreal Canadiens, New Jersey Devils, New York Islanders, Ottawa Senators, Philadelphia Flyers, San Jose Sharks, St. Louis Blues, Tampa Bay Lightning, Toronto Maple Leafs, Vancouver Canucks, Washington Capitals

This produced a total of 48 lottery balls. As a result, teams with three balls had a 6.3% chance of winning the lottery, two balls 4.2%, and one ball 2.1%. The Pittsburgh Penguins won the lottery and therefore the first overall pick. Further drawing of team names was used to determine the order of the remaining picks.

Final central scouting rankings

Skaters

Goaltenders

Selections by round

Round one

Round two

Round three

Round four

Round five

Round six

Round seven

Draftees based on nationality

North American draftees by state/province

See also 
2005–06 NHL season
List of NHL first overall draft choices
List of NHL players

References 

National Hockey League (2005). 2005 NHL Draft. Retrieved July 31, 2005.
Description of the lottery

External links 
 2005 NHL Entry Draft player stats at The Internet Hockey Database

Draft
National Hockey League Entry Draft
Ice hockey in Ottawa